Tescoma is a Czech manufacturer of kitchen utensils. The company was founded in 1992 in Zlín. It currently operates in 130 countries around the world.

History 
The Tescoma company was founded in 1992 in Zlín by Petr Chmela and Jiří Vaculík, initially, they were engaged in the sale of water savers. Since 1994, the company started with the production of kitchen utensils, which in the following years became its dominant product. The company regularly participated in world trade fairs and in 1996 opened its first foreign branch in Italy. When groceries and merchandise retailer Tesco entered the Czech market in 1996, it demanded that the company be renamed due to the similarity of their names. The dispute eventually resulted in cooperation and Tescoma even sold their goods in Tesco shopping centers.

Several Tescoma products have a worldwide patent, and many have won design awards, such as the Red Dot Design Award, the Good Design Award and the German Design Award. Currently (2017), Tescoma operates in 130 countries around the world and has nine foreign branches (Italy, Spain, Portugal, Slovakia, Russia, Ukraine, Poland, Germany and China). In Italy, it is one of the three most famous brands in the industry. Tescoma co-founder Petr Chmela received in 2017 the Czech Entrepreneur of the Year Award. It presents three hundred products every year.

References

External links 
 Tescomaonline.com
 Tescoma.cz in Czech, Tescoma.it in Italian, Tescoma.co.uk in English, Tescoma.de in German, Tescoma.es in Spanish, Tescoma.pl in Polish,Tescoma.pt in Portuguese Tescoma.ru in Russian.

Manufacturing companies established in 1992
Kitchenware brands
Food preparation utensils
Manufacturing companies of the Czech Republic